1945 in philosophy

Events 
 January 1? - Jean-Paul Sartre refuses the Legion of Honour.

Publications 
 Aldous Huxley, The Perennial Philosophy
 Maurice Merleau-Ponty, Phenomenology of Perception (Phénoménologie de la perception)
 Karl Popper, The Open Society and Its Enemies

Philosophical fiction 
 Hermann Broch, The Death of Virgil (Der Tod des Vergil)
 George Orwell, Animal Farm
 Jean-Paul Sartre, The Age of Reason (L'âge de raison)

Births 
 September 9 - Robert Alexy 
 Philip Pettit

Deaths 
 February 1 - Johan Huizinga (born 1872)
 April 13 - Ernst Cassirer (born 1874)
 June 7 - Kitaro Nishida (born 1870)
 July 20 - Paul Valéry (born 1871)
 December 22 - Otto Neurath (born 1882)

References 

Philosophy
20th-century philosophy
Philosophy by year